Aghin is a village in the Ani Municipality of the Shirak Province of Armenia.

Demographics
The Statistical Committee of Armenia reported that the community's population was 598 in 2010, up from 547 at the 2001 census. The village of Aghin's population was 474 at the 2001 census.

References 

Communities in Shirak Province
Populated places in Shirak Province